Pitofenone is an antispasmodic.  

Pitofenone is typically used in combination with fenpiverinium bromide, and metamizole sodium. Previously produced as Baralgin by Sanofi Aventis, the drug is currently sold in Eastern Europe under various trade names, including Spasmalgon (Actavis, Bulgaria), Revalgin (Shreya, India), Spasgan (Wockhardt, India), Bral (Micro Labs, India), and others. It relieves pain and spasms of smooth muscles.

References

Benzoate esters
1-Piperidinyl compounds
Benzophenones
Phenol ethers